The water buffalo incident was a controversy at the University of Pennsylvania in 1993, in which an Israeli-born Jewish student, Eden Jacobowitz, was charged with violating the university's racial harassment policy.  The incident received widespread publicity as part of the increasing debate about political correctness in the United States in the 1990s.

History
The incident occurred on January 13, 1993, when Eden Jacobowitz shouted, "Shut up, you water buffalo! If you're looking for a party, there's a zoo a mile from here," out of his window to a crowd of mostly black Delta Sigma Theta sorority sisters making noise outside his dorm.

Initially Jacobowitz had an advisor assigned to him, who urged him to accept the University's offer of a settlement. The settlement required him to admit to violating the racial harassment policy. Instead, he contested the university's decision under the advice of Penn history professor and libertarian activist Alan Charles Kors.

Jacobowitz, who was born in Israel and speaks Hebrew, explained his choice of "water buffalo" as from Hebrew slang "behema" (animal or beast, see also behemoth), used by Israelis to refer to a loud, rowdy person. He procured several expert witnesses who attested to this and others, such as Michael Meyers, President and Executive Director of the New York Civil Rights Coalition, who gave testimonies that "water buffalo" was not a racial epithet against African Americans.

Jacobowitz's story was brought to the fore by the media focus on Penn. On April 23, several days before his hearing, the New York-based Jewish Daily Forward broke his story with the headline "Pennsylvania Preparing to Buffalo a Yeshiva Boy". The story gained even wider media coverage after The Wall Street Journal picked up the story with an editorial entitled "Buffaloed at Penn" on April 26. Jacobowitz was interviewed on television several times.

Based on testimony that Jacobowitz had called the women "water buffalo" and the university's belief that this was a racial epithet, it proceeded with prosecuting him. On May 13, 1993, news anchor John Chancellor had the following commentary:

Eden Jacobowitz is a student at the University of Pennsylvania. His studies were interrupted by a noisy crowd of students, many black and female. He yelled out his window, "Shut up, you water buffalo." He is now charged with racial harassment under the university's Code of Conduct. The school offered to dismiss the charge if he would apologize, attend a racial sensitivity seminar, agree to dormitory probation, and accept a temporary mark on his record which would brand him as guilty. He was told the term "water buffalo" could be interpreted as racist because a water buffalo is a dark primitive animal that lives in Africa. That is questionable semantics, dubious zoology, and incorrect geography. Water buffalo live in Asia, not in Africa. This from the University of Pennsylvania. Mr. Jacobowitz is fighting back. The rest of us, however, are still in trouble. The language police are at work on the campuses of our better schools. The word cops are marching under the banner of political correctness. The culture of victimization is hunting for quarry. American English is in danger of losing its muscle and energy. That's what these bozos are doing to us

Vernon Jordan offered a dissenting viewpoint years later when he wrote "the participant in the white mob became a hero for the right wing, while the four black women remained faceless and the objects of national ridicule." University President Sheldon Hackney argued that the incident "was hijacked for ideological purposes" and that dismissing the phrase as harmless "ignores the long history of animalistic representations of African Americans as part of white supremacy's mind game [and] ignores the question of what the women thought they heard and why they got so angry."

Although the incident prompted widespread media coverage, the University did not discuss its actions. The hearing was delayed for another two months while international press commented and criticized Penn's decisions. Garry Trudeau devoted a Sunday's Doonesbury to the water buffalo incident.

The University declined repeated requests by Jacobowitz's legal teams to have charges dropped. At the hearing the panel decided not to dismiss the charges and issued a gag order to keep proceedings from leaking to the press.

Amid public scrutiny, the University denied issuing a gag order, and Sheldon Hackney offered Kors a deal in which Jacobowitz would apologize for rudeness and the University and the plaintiffs would drop the charges. The affair ended when at a press conference the 15 women agreed to drop charges, stating that the media coverage made it unlikely they would get a fair hearing. The University stated there were no charges pending.

A second student, Jacobowitz's roommate, was also charged by the university and placed on probation for his part in the original midnight ruckus.

See also

African American–Jewish relations
Controversies about the word "niggardly"
University of Pennsylvania controversies

References

External links
The water buffalo incident through eyes of Jacobowitz Daily Pennsylvanian, 4/15/2003
GUEST COLUMNIST: Kors: Penn, Hackney mishandled 'water buffalo' case Daily Pennsylvanian, 12/7/1998
Sheldon Hackney's Spring From Hell Pennsylvania Gazette May/June 2003
Book excerpt from The Shadow University

1993 controversies in the United States
1993 in Pennsylvania
African-American history in Philadelphia
African American–Jewish relations
Anti-black racism in the United States
Hebrew language
History of racism in Pennsylvania
Israeli-American history
Jews and Judaism in Philadelphia
Linguistic controversies
Politics and race in the United States
University of Pennsylvania